Ichthyocephalidae is a family of nematodes belonging to the order Rhabditida.

Genera:
 Ichthyocephaloides Hunt & Sutherland, 1984
 Icthyocephalus Artigas, 1926
 Paraichthyocephalus Travassos & Kloss, 1958
 Xystrognathus Hunt, Luc & Spiridonov, 2002

References

Nematodes